Sea daisies (infraclass Concentricycloidea; order Peripodida) make up an unusual group of deep-sea taxa belonging to the phylum Echinodermata, with three species described in the genus Xyloplax. Intestine and anus are absent.

Distribution
Sea daisies have been discovered in three localities, including deep-sea habitats off New Zealand, the Bahamas and most recently from the northern central Pacific. They have been collected primarily from sunken, deep-sea (1000+ meters) wood. Although known from only a handful of specimens initially, many specimens have now been collected from the Bahamas.

Classification
Since they were discovered in 1986, their position within the echinoderms has been debated. At first they were placed in a new class, Concentricycloidea, since it was unclear whether they might have affinities with asteroids or ophiuroids. The former view gained acceptance, and since 2006, they are currently considered a sister group to the Infraclass Neoasteroidea, which represents all post-Paleozoic asteroids within the Class Asteroidea.

Class Asteroidea, 
Infraclass Concentricycloidea, 
Order Peripoda (or Peripodida), 
Family Xyloplacidae
 Genus Xyloplax
 Xyloplax janetae
 Xyloplax medusiformis
 Xyloplax turnerae

References
Introduction to Xyloplax
Controversies in Xyloplax Classification
 Classification of the Extant Echinodermata 
 Nature "A new class of Echinodermata from New Zealand"

Peripodida